Puieşti may refer to several places in Romania:

 Puieşti, a commune in Buzău County
 Puieşti, a commune in Vaslui County

See also 
 Puiu (name)